The Citroën E-Méhari is a limited-production electric off-road subcompact SUV produced by the French car maker Citroën that began to be produced in 2016. Approximately 1,000 cars were planned to be produced in collaboration with the French electric car producer Bolloré. Sales began in France in spring 2016 with pricing starting at  excluding the battery leasing.

References

External links

 Official website

E-Méhari
Cars introduced in 2016
Electric cars
Production electric cars
Mini sport utility vehicles